925 Grand is the former headquarters of the Federal Reserve Bank of Kansas City and was the oldest building in active use of any Federal Reserve Bank.  It was added to the National Register of Historic Places in 2007.

In 1913 Kansas City and St. Louis had a fierce rivalry over which city was to get a headquarters, but in the end, both cities received one. (Missouri is the only state to have multiple headquarters. Among the reasons noted for the award is that former Kansas City mayor James A. Reed, who was on the Senate Banking Committee, broke the deadlock to permit passage of the Federal Reserve Act.

The first bank building was in the R.A. Long Building at 928 Grand, which opened on November 16, 1914, until a new $4.3 million building could be built across the street at 925 Grand, which formally opened in November 1921 in Downtown Kansas City. Shortly after it was established the bank rented space to outside tenants.

The building, designed by Chicago Wrigley Building architect Graham, Anderson, Probst & White was Missouri's tallest building from 1921 to 1926 and Kansas City's tallest building from 1921 to 1929.

President Harry S. Truman had his office in Room 1107 of the building from when he left the Presidency in 1953 until the Truman Library was completed in 1957.

In 2008, the Federal Reserve moved to a new building off of Main Street by the Liberty Memorial designed by architect Henry N. Cobb. Townsend, Inc. of Overland Park, Kansas, bought the building for $10.8 million in 2005 and the Federal Reserve continued as a tenant until its new quarters opened in 2008. In 2013, Townsend lost the building when its lender, Great Western Bank of Sioux Falls, South Dakota, took back the property at courthouse auction. A Boston lender is providing funding to a new developer who plans to convert the building into a hotel.

References

External links

Skyscraper office buildings in Kansas City, Missouri
Bank buildings on the National Register of Historic Places in Missouri
Government buildings completed in 1921
Federal Reserve Bank of Kansas City
Federal Reserve Bank buildings
Government buildings in Kansas
National Register of Historic Places in Kansas City, Missouri
Downtown Kansas City